The Domville Baronetcy, of St Alban's in the County of Hertford, was a title in the Baronetage of the United Kingdom. It was created on 28 July 1814 for William Domville, Lord Mayor of London from 1813 to 1814. He was a descendant of William Domville, elder brother of Gilbert Domvile, ancestor of the Domvile baronets of Tempoleogue. The title became extinct on the death of the seventh Baronet in 1981.

Domville baronets, of St Alban's (1814)
Sir William Domville, 1st Baronet (1742–1833)
Sir William Domville, 2nd Baronet (1774–1860)
Sir James Graham Domville, 3rd Baronet (1812–1887)
Sir William Cecil Henry Domville, 4th Baronet (1849–1904)
Sir James Henry Domville, 5th Baronet (1889–1919)
Sir Cecil Lionel Domville, 6th Baronet (1892–1930)
Sir Gerald Guy Domville, 7th Baronet (1896–1981)

See also
Domvile baronets

References

Extinct baronetcies in the Baronetage of the United Kingdom
People educated at St Albans School, Hertfordshire